Grasshoppers are a group of insects belonging to the suborder Caelifera. They are among what is possibly the most ancient living group of chewing herbivorous insects, dating back to the early Triassic around 250 million years ago.

Grasshoppers are typically ground-dwelling insects with powerful hind legs which allow them to escape from threats by leaping vigorously. As hemimetabolous insects, they do not undergo complete metamorphosis; they hatch from an egg into a nymph or "hopper" which undergoes five moults, becoming more similar to the adult insect at each developmental stage. The grasshopper hears through the tympanal organ which can be found in the first segment of the abdomen attached to the thorax; while its sense of vision is in the compound eyes, the change in light intensity is perceived in the simple eyes (ocelli). At high population densities and under certain environmental conditions, some grasshopper species can change color and behavior and form swarms. Under these circumstances, they are known as locusts.

Grasshoppers are plant-eaters, with a few species at times becoming serious pests of cereals, vegetables and pasture, especially when they swarm in the millions as locusts and destroy crops over wide areas. They protect themselves from predators by camouflage; when detected, many species attempt to startle the predator with a brilliantly-coloured wing-flash while jumping and (if adult) launching themselves into the air, usually flying for only a short distance. Other species such as the rainbow grasshopper have warning coloration which deters predators. Grasshoppers are affected by parasites and various diseases, and many predatory creatures feed on both nymphs and adults. The eggs are subject to attack by parasitoids and predators.

Grasshoppers have had a long relationship with humans. Swarms of locusts can have devastating effects and cause famine, having done so since Biblical times. Even in smaller numbers, the insects can be serious pests. They are used as food in countries such as Mexico and Indonesia. They feature in art, symbolism and literature. The study of grasshopper species is called acridology.

Phylogeny
Grasshoppers belong to the suborder Caelifera. Although "grasshopper" is sometimes used as a common name for the suborder in general, some sources restrict it to the more "advanced" groups. They may be placed in the infraorder Acrididea and have been referred-to as "short-horned grasshoppers" in older texts to distinguish them from the also-obsolete term "long-horned grasshoppers" (now bush-crickets or katydids) with their much longer antennae. The phylogeny of the Caelifera, based on mitochondrial ribosomal RNA of thirty-two taxa in six out of seven superfamilies, is shown as a cladogram. The Ensifera (crickets, etc.), Caelifera and all the superfamilies of grasshoppers except Pamphagoidea appear to be monophyletic.

In evolutionary terms, the split between the Caelifera and the Ensifera is no more recent than the Permo-Triassic boundary; the earliest insects that are certainly Caeliferans are in the extinct families Locustopseidae and Locustavidae from the early Triassic, roughly 250 million years ago. The group diversified during the Triassic and have remained important plant-eaters from that time to now. The first modern families such as the Eumastacidae, Tetrigidae and Tridactylidae appeared in the Cretaceous, though some insects that might belong to the last two of these groups are found in the early Jurassic. Morphological classification is difficult because many taxa have converged towards a common habitat type; recent taxonomists have concentrated on the internal genitalia, especially those of the male. This information is not available from fossil specimens, and the palaeontological taxonomy is founded principally on the venation of the hindwings.

The Caelifera includes some 2,400 valid genera and about 11,000 known species. Many undescribed species probably exist, especially in tropical wet forests. The Caelifera have a predominantly tropical distribution with fewer species known from temperate zones, but most of the superfamilies have representatives worldwide. They are almost exclusively herbivorous and are probably the oldest living group of chewing herbivorous insects.

The most diverse superfamily is the Acridoidea, with around 8,000 species. The two main families in this are the Acrididae (grasshoppers and locusts) with a worldwide distribution, and the Romaleidae (lubber grasshoppers), found chiefly in the New World. The Ommexechidae and Tristiridae are South American, and the Lentulidae, Lithidiidae and Pamphagidae are mainly African. The Pauliniids are nocturnal and can swim or skate on water, and the Lentulids are wingless. Pneumoridae are native to Africa, particularly southern Africa, and are distinguished by the inflated abdomens of the males.

Characteristics
Grasshoppers have the typical insect body plan of head, thorax and abdomen. The head is held vertically at an angle to the body, with the mouth at the bottom. The head bears a large pair of compound eyes which give all-round vision, three simple eyes which can detect light and dark, and a pair of thread-like antennae that are sensitive to touch and smell. The downward-directed mouthparts are modified for chewing and there are two sensory palps in front of the jaws.

The thorax and abdomen are segmented and have a rigid cuticle made up of overlapping plates composed of chitin. The three fused thoracic segments bear three pairs of legs and two pairs of wings. The forewings, known as tegmina, are narrow and leathery while the hindwings are large and membranous, the veins providing strength. The legs are terminated by claws for gripping. The hind leg is particularly powerful; the femur is robust and has several ridges where different surfaces join and the inner ridges bear stridulatory pegs in some species. The posterior edge of the tibia bears a double row of spines and there are a pair of articulated spurs near its lower end. The interior of the thorax houses the muscles that control the wings and legs.

The abdomen has eleven segments, the first of which is fused to the thorax and contains the tympanal organ and hearing system. Segments two to eight are ring-shaped and joined by flexible membranes. Segments nine to eleven are reduced in size; segment nine bears a pair of cerci and segments ten and eleven have the reproductive organs. Female grasshoppers are normally larger than males, with short ovipositors. The name of the suborder "Caelifera" comes from the Latin and means chisel-bearing, referring to the shape of the ovipositor.

Those species that make easily heard noises usually do so by rubbing a row of pegs on the hind legs against the edges of the forewings (stridulation). These sounds are produced mainly by males to attract females, though in some species the females also stridulate.

Grasshoppers may be confused with crickets, but they differ in many aspects; these include the number of segments in their antennae and the structure of the ovipositor, as well as the location of the tympanal organ and the methods by which sound is produced. Ensiferans have antennae that can be much longer than the body and have at least 20–24 segments, while caeliferans have fewer segments in their shorter, stouter antennae.

Biology

Diet and digestion

Most grasshoppers are polyphagous, eating vegetation from multiple plant sources, but some are omnivorous and also eat animal tissue and animal faeces. In general their preference is for grasses, including many cereals grown as crops. The digestive system is typical of insects, with Malpighian tubules discharging into the midgut. Carbohydrates are digested mainly in the crop, while proteins are digested in the ceca of the midgut. Saliva is abundant but largely free of enzymes, helping to move food and Malpighian secretions along the gut. Some grasshoppers possess cellulase, which by softening plant cell walls makes plant cell contents accessible to other digestive enzymes. Grasshoppers can also be cannibalistic when swarming.

Sensory organs

Grasshoppers have a typical insect nervous system, and have an extensive set of external sense organs. On the side of the head are a pair of large compound eyes which give a broad field of vision and can detect movement, shape, colour and distance. There are also three simple eyes (ocelli) on the forehead which can detect light intensity, a pair of antennae containing olfactory (smell) and touch receptors, and mouthparts containing gustatory (taste) receptors. At the front end of the abdomen there is a pair of tympanal organs for sound reception. There are numerous fine hairs (setae) covering the whole body that act as mechanoreceptors (touch and wind sensors), and these are most dense on the antennae, the palps (part of the mouth), and on the cerci at the tip of the abdomen. There are special receptors (campaniform sensillae) embedded in the cuticle of the legs that sense pressure and cuticle distortion. There are internal "chordotonal" sense organs specialized to detect position and movement about the joints of the exoskeleton. The receptors convey information to the central nervous system through sensory neurons, and most of these have their cell bodies located in the periphery near the receptor site itself.

Circulation and respiration 

Like other insects, grasshoppers have an open circulatory system and their body cavities are filled with haemolymph. A heart-like structure in the upper part of the abdomen pumps the fluid to the head from where it percolates past the tissues and organs on its way back to the abdomen. This system circulates nutrients throughout the body and carries metabolic wastes to be excreted into the gut. Other functions of the haemolymph include wound healing, heat transfer and the provision of hydrostatic pressure, but the circulatory system is not involved in gaseous exchange. Respiration is performed using tracheae, air-filled tubes, which open at the surfaces of the thorax and abdomen through pairs of valved spiracles. Larger insects may need to actively ventilate their bodies by opening some spiracles while others remain closed, using abdominal muscles to expand and contract the body and pump air through the system.

Jumping 

Grasshoppers jump by extending their large back legs and pushing against the substrate (the ground, a twig, a blade of grass or whatever else they are standing on); the reaction force propels them into the air. A large grasshopper, such as a locust, can jump about a metre (twenty body lengths) without using its wings; the acceleration peaks at about 20 g.

They jump for several reasons; to escape from a predator, to launch themselves into flight, or simply to move from place to place. For the escape jump in particular there is strong selective pressure to maximize take-off velocity, since this determines the range. This means that the legs must thrust against the ground with both high force and a high velocity of movement. A fundamental property of muscle is that it cannot contract with high force and high velocity at the same time. Grasshoppers overcome this by using a catapult mechanism to amplify the mechanical power produced by their muscles.

The jump is a three-stage process. First, the grasshopper fully flexes the lower part of the leg (tibia) against the upper part (femur) by activating the flexor tibiae muscle (the back legs of the grasshopper in the top photograph are in this preparatory position). Second, there is a period of co-contraction in which force builds up in the large, pennate extensor tibiae muscle, but the tibia is kept flexed by the simultaneous contraction of the flexor tibiae muscle. The extensor muscle is much stronger than the flexor muscle, but the latter is aided by specialisations in the joint that give it a large effective mechanical advantage over the former when the tibia is fully flexed. Co-contraction can last for up to half a second, and during this period the extensor muscle shortens and stores elastic strain energy by distorting stiff cuticular structures in the leg. The extensor muscle contraction is quite slow (almost isometric), which allows it to develop high force (up to 14 N in the desert locust), but because it is slow only low power is needed. The third stage of the jump is the trigger relaxation of the flexor muscle, which releases the tibia from the flexed position. The subsequent rapid tibial extension is driven mainly by the relaxation of the elastic structures, rather than by further shortening of the extensor muscle. In this way the stiff cuticle acts like the elastic of a catapult, or the bow of a bow-and-arrow. Energy is put into the store at low power by slow but strong muscle contraction, and retrieved from the store at high power by rapid relaxation of the mechanical elastic structures.

Stridulation

Male grasshoppers spend much of the day stridulating, singing more actively under optimal conditions and being more subdued when conditions are adverse; females also stridulate, but their efforts are insignificant when compared to the males. Late-stage male nymphs can sometimes be seen making stridulatory movements, although they lack the equipment to make sounds, demonstrating the importance of this behavioural trait. The songs are a means of communication; the male stridulation seems to express reproductive maturity, the desire for social cohesion and individual well-being. Social cohesion becomes necessary among grasshoppers because of their ability to jump or fly large distances, and the song can serve to limit dispersal and guide others to favourable habitat. The generalised song can vary in phraseology and intensity, and is modified in the presence of a rival male, and changes again to a courtship song when a female is nearby. In male grasshoppers of the family Pneumoridae, the enlarged abdomen amplifies stridulation.

Life cycle

In most grasshopper species, conflicts between males over females rarely escalate beyond ritualistic displays. Some exceptions include the chameleon grasshopper (Kosciuscola tristis), where males may fight on top of ovipositing females; engaging in leg grappling, biting, kicking and mounting.

The newly emerged female grasshopper has a preoviposition period of a week or two while she increases in weight and her eggs mature. After mating, the female of most species digs a hole with her ovipositor and lays a batch of eggs in a pod in the ground near food plants, generally in the summer. After laying the eggs, she covers the hole with soil and litter. Some, like the semi-aquatic Cornops aquaticum, deposit the pod directly into plant tissue. The eggs in the pod are glued together with a froth in some species. After a few weeks of development, the eggs of most species in temperate climates go into diapause, and pass the winter in this state. Diapause is broken by a sufficiently low ground temperature, with development resuming as soon as the ground warms above a certain threshold temperature. The embryos in a pod generally all hatch out within a few minutes of each other. They soon shed their membranes and their exoskeletons harden. These first instar nymphs can then jump away from predators.

Grasshoppers undergo incomplete metamorphosis: they repeatedly moult, each instar becoming larger and more like an adult, with the wing-buds increasing in size at each stage. The number of instars varies between species but is often six. After the final moult, the wings are inflated and become fully functional. The migratory grasshopper, Melanoplus sanguinipes, spends about 25 to 30 days as a nymph, depending on sex and temperature, and lives for about 51 days as an adult.

Swarming

Locusts are the swarming phase of certain species of short-horned grasshoppers in the family Acrididae. Swarming behaviour is a response to overcrowding. Increased tactile stimulation of the hind legs causes an increase in levels of serotonin. This causes the grasshopper to change colour, feed more and breed faster. The transformation of a solitary individual into a swarming one is induced by several contacts per minute over a short period.

Following this transformation, under suitable conditions dense nomadic bands of flightless nymphs known as "hoppers" can occur, producing pheromones which attract the insects to each other. With several generations in a year, the locust population can build up from localised groups into vast accumulations of flying insects known as plagues, devouring all the vegetation they encounter.

Predators, parasites, and pathogens

Grasshoppers have a wide range of predators at different stages of their lives; eggs are eaten by bee-flies, ground beetles and blister beetles; hoppers and adults are taken by other insects such as ants, robber flies and sphecid wasps, by spiders, and by many birds and small mammals including dogs and cats.

The eggs and nymphs are under attack by parasitoids including blow flies, flesh flies, and tachinid flies. External parasites of adults and nymphs include mites. Female grasshoppers parasitised by mites produce fewer eggs and thus have fewer offspring than unaffected individuals.

The grasshopper nematode (Mermis nigrescens) is a long slender worm that infects grasshoppers, living in the insect's hemocoel. Adult worms lay eggs on plants and the host becomes infected when the foliage is eaten. Spinochordodes tellinii and Paragordius tricuspidatus are parasitic worms that infect grasshoppers and alter the behaviour of their hosts. When the worms are sufficiently developed, the grasshopper is persuaded to leap into a nearby body of water where it drowns, thus enabling the parasite to continue with the next stage of its life cycle, which takes place in water.

Grasshoppers are affected by diseases caused by bacteria, viruses, fungi and protozoa. The bacteria Serratia marcescens and Pseudomonas aeruginosa have both been implicated in causing disease in grasshoppers, as has the entomopathogenic fungus Beauveria bassiana. This widespread fungus has been used to control various pest insects around the world, but although it infects grasshoppers, the infection is not usually lethal because basking in the sun has the result of raising the insect's temperature above a threshold tolerated by the fungus. The fungal pathogen Entomophaga grylli is able to influence the behaviour of its grasshopper host, causing it to climb to the top of a plant and cling to the stem as it dies. This ensures wide dispersal of the fungal spores liberated from the corpse.

The fungal pathogen Metarhizium acridum is found in Africa, Australia and Brazil where it has caused epizootics in grasshoppers. It is being investigated for possible use as a microbial insecticide for locust control. The microsporidian fungus Nosema locustae, once considered to be a protozoan, can be lethal to grasshoppers. It has to be consumed by mouth and is the basis for a bait-based commercial microbial pesticide. Various other microsporidians and protozoans are found in the gut.

Anti-predator defences

Grasshoppers exemplify a range of anti-predator adaptations, enabling them to avoid detection, to escape if detected, and in some cases to avoid being eaten if captured. Grasshoppers are often camouflaged to avoid detection by predators that hunt by sight; some species can change their coloration to suit their surroundings.

Several species such as the hooded leaf grasshopper Phyllochoreia ramakrishnai (Eumastacoidea) are detailed mimics of leaves. Stick grasshoppers (Proscopiidae) mimic wooden sticks in form and coloration. Grasshoppers often have deimatic patterns on their wings, giving a sudden flash of bright colours that may startle predators long enough to give time to escape in a combination of jump and flight.

Some species are genuinely aposematic, having both bright warning coloration and sufficient toxicity to dissuade predators. Dictyophorus productus (Pyrgomorphidae) is a "heavy, bloated, sluggish insect" that makes no attempt to hide; it has a bright red abdomen. A Cercopithecus monkey that ate other grasshoppers refused to eat the species. Another species, the rainbow or painted grasshopper of Arizona, Dactylotum bicolor (Acridoidea), has been shown by experiment with a natural predator, the little striped whiptail lizard, to be aposematic.

Relationship with humans

In art and media
Grasshoppers are occasionally depicted in artworks, such as the Dutch Golden Age painter Balthasar van der Ast's still life oil painting, Flowers in a Vase with Shells and Insects, c. 1630, now in the National Gallery, London, though the insect may be a bush-cricket.

Another orthopteran is found in Rachel Ruysch's still life Flowers in a Vase, c. 1685. The seemingly static scene is animated by a "grasshopper on the table that looks about ready to spring", according to the gallery curator Betsy Wieseman, with other invertebrates including a spider, an ant, and two caterpillars.

Grasshoppers are also featured in cinema. The 1957 film Beginning of the End portrayed giant grasshoppers attacking Chicago. In the 1998 Disney/Pixar animated film A Bug's Life, the antagonists are a gang of grasshoppers, with their leader Hopper serving as the main villain.

Symbolism

Grasshoppers are sometimes used as symbols. During the Greek Archaic Era, the grasshopper was the symbol of the polis of Athens, possibly because they were among the most common insects on the dry plains of Attica. Native Athenians for a while wore golden grasshopper brooches to symbolise that they were of pure Athenian lineage with no foreign ancestors. In addition, Peisistratus hung the figure of a kind of grasshopper before the Acropolis of Athens as apotropaic magic.

Another symbolic use of the grasshopper is Sir Thomas Gresham's gilded grasshopper in Lombard Street, London, dating from 1563; the building was for a while the headquarters of the Guardian Royal Exchange, but the company declined to use the symbol for fear of confusion with the locust.

When grasshoppers appear in dreams, these have been interpreted as symbols of "Freedom, independence, spiritual enlightenment, inability to settle down or commit to decision". Locusts are taken literally to mean devastation of crops in the case of farmers; figuratively as "wicked men and women" for non-farmers; and "Extravagance, misfortune, & ephemeral happiness" by "gypsies".

As food

In some countries, grasshoppers are used as food. In southern Mexico, grasshoppers, known as chapulines, are eaten in a variety of dishes, such as in tortillas with chilli sauce. Grasshoppers are served on skewers in some Chinese food markets, like the Donghuamen Night Market. Fried grasshoppers (walang goreng) are eaten in the Gunung Kidul Regency, Yogyakarta, Java in Indonesia. Grasshoppers are a beloved delicacy in Uganda; they are usually eaten fried (most commonly in November and May after the rains). In America, the Ohlone burned grassland to herd grasshoppers into pits where they could be collected as food.

It is recorded in the Bible that John the Baptist ate locusts and wild honey (Greek: ἀκρίδες καὶ μέλι ἄγριον, akrídes kaì méli ágrion) while living in the wilderness. However, because of a tradition of depicting him as an ascetic, attempts have been made to explain that the locusts were in fact a suitably ascetic vegetarian food such as carob beans, notwithstanding the fact that the word ἀκρίδες means plainly grasshoppers.

In recent years, with the search for alternative healthy and sustainable protein sources, grasshoppers are being cultivated by commercial companies operating grasshopper farms and are being used as food and protein supplements.

As pests

Grasshoppers eat large quantities of foliage both as adults and during their development, and can be serious pests of arid land and prairies. Pasture, grain, forage, vegetable and other crops can be affected. Grasshoppers often bask in the sun, and thrive in warm sunny conditions, so drought stimulates an increase in grasshopper populations. A single season of drought is not normally sufficient to stimulate a major population increase, but several successive dry seasons can do so, especially if the intervening winters are mild so that large numbers of nymphs survive. Although sunny weather stimulates growth, there needs to be an adequate food supply for the increasing grasshopper population. This means that although precipitation is needed to stimulate plant growth, prolonged periods of cloudy weather will slow nymphal development.

Grasshoppers can best be prevented from becoming pests by manipulating their environment. Shade provided by trees will discourage them and they may be prevented from moving onto developing crops by removing coarse vegetation from fallow land and field margins and discouraging thick growth beside ditches and on roadside verges. With increasing numbers of grasshoppers, predator numbers may increase, but this seldom happens rapidly enough to have much effect on populations. Biological control is being investigated, and spores of the protozoan parasite Nosema locustae can be used mixed with bait to control grasshoppers, being more effective with immature insects. On a small scale, neem products can be effective as a feeding deterrent and as a disruptor of nymphal development. Insecticides can be used, but adult grasshoppers are difficult to kill, and as they move into fields from surrounding rank growth, crops may soon become reinfested.

Some grasshopper species, like the Chinese rice grasshopper, are a pest in rice paddies. Ploughing exposes the eggs on the surface of the field, to be destroyed by sunshine or eaten by natural enemies. Some eggs may be buried too deeply in the soil for hatching to take place.

Locust plagues can have devastating effects on human populations, causing famines and population upheavals. They are mentioned in both the Koran and the Bible and have also been held responsible for cholera epidemics, resulting from the corpses of locusts drowned in the Mediterranean Sea and decomposing on beaches. The FAO and other organisations monitor locust activity around the world. Timely application of pesticides can prevent nomadic bands of hoppers from forming before dense swarms of adults can build up. Besides conventional control using contact insecticides, biological pest control using the entomopathogenic fungus Metarhizium acridum, which specifically infects grasshoppers, has been used with some success.

Detection  of explosives
In February 2020, researchers from Washington University in St. Louis announced they had engineered "cyborg grasshoppers" capable of accurately detecting explosives. In the project, funded by the US Office of Naval Research, researchers fitted grasshoppers with lightweight sensor backpacks that recorded and transmitted the electrical activity of their antennal lobes to a computer. According to the researchers, the grasshoppers were able to detect the location of the highest concentration of explosives. The researchers also tested the effect of combining sensorial information from several grasshoppers on detection accuracy. The neural activity from seven grasshoppers yielded an average detection accuracy rate of 80%, whereas a single grasshopper yielded a 60% rate.

In literature

The Egyptian word for locust or grasshopper was written snḥm in the consonantal hieroglyphic writing system. The pharaoh Ramesses II compared the armies of the Hittites to locusts: "They covered the mountains and valleys and were like locusts in their multitude."

One of Aesop's Fables, later retold by La Fontaine, is the tale of The Ant and the Grasshopper. The ant works hard all summer, while the grasshopper plays. In winter, the ant is ready but the grasshopper starves. Somerset Maugham's short story "The Ant and the Grasshopper" explores the fable's symbolism via complex framing. Other human weaknesses besides improvidence have become identified with the grasshopper's behaviour. So an unfaithful woman (hopping from man to man) is "a grasshopper" in "Poprygunya", an 1892 short story by Anton Chekhov, and in Jerry Paris's 1969 film The Grasshopper.

In mechanical engineering

The name "Grasshopper" was given to the Aeronca L-3 and Piper L-4 light aircraft, both used for reconnaissance and other support duties in World War II. The name is said to have originated when Major General Innis P. Swift saw a Piper making a rough landing and remarked that it looked like a grasshopper for its bouncing progress.

Grasshopper beam engines were beam engines pivoted at one end, the long horizontal arm resembling the hind leg of a grasshopper. The type was patented by William Freemantle in 1803.

Notes

References

Sources

External links 
 
 
 
 

 
Extant Triassic first appearances
Herbivorous insects

Insects in culture
Insect common names